The Eyprepocnemidinae are a subfamily of Acrididae (originally described by Brunner von Wattenwyl under the synonym: Euprepocnemes) in the Orthoptera: Caelifera. Species can be found in Africa, mainland Europe and Asia.

Genera 
The Orthoptera Species File lists the following:

Tribe Eyprepocnemidini 
Auth. Brunner von Wattenwyl, 1893
 Euprepocnemides Bolívar, 1914
 Eyprepocnemis Fieber, 1853
 Eyprepocprifas Donskoff, 1983
 Heteracris Walker, 1870
 Shirakiacris Dirsh, 1958

Tribe not determined
 Amphiprosopia Uvarov, 1921
 Belonocnemis Bolívar, 1914
 Cataloipus Bolívar, 1890
 Clomacris Popov, 1981
 Cyathosternum Bolívar, 1882
 Jagoa Popov, 1980 - monotypic Jagoa gwynni (Uvarov, 1941)
 Jucundacris Uvarov, 1921
 Malagacetrus Dirsh, 1962
 Malonjeacris Grunshaw, 1995
 Metaxymecus Karsch, 1893
 Neritius Bolívar, 1914
 Ogasawaracris Ito, 2003
 Oxyaeida Bolívar, 1914
 Paraneritius Jago, 1994
 Paraprocticus Grunshaw, 1995
 Phyllocercus Uvarov, 1941 - monotypic Phyllocercus bicoloripes Uvarov, 1941
 Squaroplatacris Liang & Zheng, 1987
 Taramassus Giglio-Tos, 1907
 Tenebracris Dirsh, 1962
 Tropidiopsis Bolívar, 1911
 Tylotropidius Stål, 1873

References

External links 
 
 

Acrididae
Caelifera
Orthoptera subfamilies